Kotra (also Romanized as Kotrā and Kotrā) is a village in Kotra Rural District, Nashta District, Tonekabon County, Mazandaran Province, Iran. At the 2006 census, its population was 1,914, in 543 families.

References 

Populated places in Tonekabon County